The Radeon 500 series is a series of graphics processors developed by AMD. These cards are based on the fourth iteration of the Graphics Core Next architecture, featuring GPUs based on Polaris 30, Polaris 20, Polaris 11, and Polaris 12 chips. Thus the RX 500 series uses the same microarchitecture and instruction set as its predecessor, while making use of improvements in the manufacturing process to enable higher clock rates.

Third-generation GCN chips are produced on a 28 nm CMOS process. Polaris (fourth-generation GCN) chips (except for Polaris 30) are produced on a 14 nm FinFET process, developed by Samsung Electronics and licensed to GlobalFoundries. Polaris 30 chips are produced on a 12 nm FinFET process, developed by Samsung and GlobalFoundries.

Chipset table 
 Supported display standards are: DisplayPort 1.4 HBR, HDMI 2.0b, HDR10 color.
 Dual-Link DVI-D and DVI-I at resolutions up to 4096×2304 are also supported, despite ports not being present on the reference cards.
 VGA-Ports at resolutions up to 2048x1536 are also supported, despite ports not being present on the reference cards, though VGA ports are mostly found on cards sold in Eastern Asia exclusively.

Desktop and laptop

See also 
 AMD Radeon Pro
 AMD FireStream
 List of AMD graphics processing units

References 

AMD graphics cards
Computer-related introductions in 2017
Graphics processing units
Graphics cards